Thomas Parkinson or Tom Parkinson may refer to:

 Thomas Parkinson (1920–1992) professor of English and poet
 Thomas Parkinson (painter) (born 1744), British portrait artist
 Thomas Parkinson (priest) (1744/5–1830), archdeacon of Huntingdon, and of Leicester
 Thomas Parkinson (MP) for Berwick-upon-Tweed (UK Parliament constituency) 1584-97
 Thomas Parkinson (American football), see List of Pittsburgh Panthers football All-Americans
 Tom Parkinson (filmmaker), see The Adventures of the Black Stallion
Tom Parkinson, character in Rattlers
 Tom Parkinson (footballer) (1899-1953), English footballer for Hartlepools United